This is a list of people elected Fellow of the Royal Society in 1931.

Fellows 

Percy George Hamnall Boswell
Vishnu Vasudev Narlikar
Alfred Joseph Clark
Charles Rundle Davidson
Reginald Ruggles Gates
Charles Stanley Gibson
Hermann Glauert
Sir Charles Robert Harington
Sir Ian Morris Heilbron
Sir Alexander Cruikshank Houston
Sydney Price James
Charles Frewen Jenkin
Stanley Wells Kemp
Thomas Howell Laby
William Kingdon Spencer
Edward Charles Titchmarsh
Wilfred Batten Lewis Trotter
Miles Walker

Foreign members

Marie Paul Auguste Charles Fabry
Emmanuel Marie Pierre Martin Jacquin de Margerie
Heinrich Otto Wieland

1931
1931 in science
1931 in the United Kingdom